Tiga Island is one of a group of small uninhabited high islands in Kimanis Bay off the western coast of Sabah, Malaysia. The islands were formed on 21 September 1897, when an earthquake on Mindanao caused a volcanic eruption near Borneo.
Tiga Island is one of the three islands that make up Tiga Island National Park.  The Park Headquarters are on the island, comprising an office complex, and accommodation for the park staff and visiting scientists.

Transportation 
Located 48 km south of Kota Kinabalu and the Tunku Abdul Rahman National Park, Tiga Island National Park is reached by driving the 140 km to Kuala Penyu, a small settlement on the tip of the Klias Peninsula.

From here it is another , or about 30 minutes, by boat. Another way of getting there is by chartering a speed boat from Kota Kinabalu and cruise to Tiga Island, or fly to Labuan and charter a speed boat from Labuan.

In the media

Tiga Island became well known through the Survivor television series. It was the setting of Survivor: Borneo, the first American season of the show. It was also the setting of the first seasons of the British shows. The island was also rumoured to be the setting of the third season of Australian Survivor. However, it was later revealed that Samoa would be used as the location for the series.

Photo gallery

See also
 List of islands of Malaysia

References

External links
 Sabah Parks page about Tiga Island updated 12.5.2021
 The Guardian interavtive web page about Tiga Island

Islands of Sabah
Uninhabited islands of Malaysia
Volcanoes of Malaysia
Mud volcanoes
Islands of the South China Sea
Landforms of Sabah